California's 19th district may refer to:

 California's 19th congressional district
 California's 19th State Assembly district
 California's 19th State Senate district